Bookchase is a board game published by Art Meets Matter. Players compete to acquire six small books for their bookshelf. They do this by partly by answering multiple-choice questions, partly by visiting special spaces on the board: The Bookshop, The Book Corner, The Library and also by chance events triggered by the turn of an Award or Sentence card.

Each player takes turns moving round the board until one player has acquired six books: one of each of six categories. Once the player has a book shelf with six books they head for the centre space and if they arrive with book shelf intact they win.

The board game was first launched and played at The Hay Festival of Literature in 2007.

Equipment
Each player is represented by a small coloured bookshelf. This is moved around the board according to the roll of two dice. Each bookshelf can accommodate up to six small books. Each book is colour-coded to represent a category of books: Sci-fi and Fantasy, Crime and Thrillers, Poetry and Plays, Children and Fun, Travel and Adventure, Classics and Modern.

Items in the standard edition are:
 The board
 6 different coloured bookshelves
 36 books - six of each category colour
 A set of small labels (or Dust jackets) - optional for use on the small books
 1200 multiple-choice question cards
 42 Award & Sentence cards
 2 dice
 Rules

Official Rules

Each Player selects a Bookchase Shelf as their playing token and places it near the board centre. For example, the Yellow Shelf is placed on the Travel Adventure space (Yellow) near the centre, the Light Blue Shelf on Crime & Thrillers space (Light Blue) etc. The Bookchase Shelf is used to collect one of each of the six coloured books representing the different categories of Bookchase. Each Player rolls the dice and the highest scorer starts play. If two or more Players tie they roll again until the highest scorer is clear. Play runs clockwise. Each Player rolls in turn. First Player rolls the dice moving this number
of spaces in any direction they choose. The idea is to visit each section of the board and claim a book by landing on a Bookchase Runner and answering a multiple-choice question correctly. A Player's turn must always use the exact number rolled. A Player may change direction at the start of each turn and at intersections or ‘dead-ends’ but no backtracking is allowed. As soon as a Player has a Bookchase Shelf with six books, one from each Category they must race for the centre space of the board. An exact number must be thrown to land on this space. Players need to be careful at this stage to avoid hazards.

Variations in play
Depending on type, age and skill level of players a number of variations of play are possible. The game is designed to allow player customisation and the creation of house rules. Known variations include: Kids, Dash, Expert, and Collector.

External links
 The official world "Bookchase" web site
 The Hay Literary Festival web site
 A blog about bookchase
 Such small portions blog

Board games introduced in 2007
Roll-and-move board games
Games of mental skill
Party board games
Quiz games